Arquímedes Arrieta (born 1 May 1918) is an Uruguayan boxer who competed in the 1936 Summer Olympics.

In 1936 he was eliminated in the second round of the featherweight class after losing his fight to John Treadaway.

External links
profile

1918 births
Possibly living people
Featherweight boxers
Olympic boxers of Uruguay
Boxers at the 1936 Summer Olympics
Uruguayan male boxers